HMS Hampshire was a 38-gun fourth-rate frigate of the English Royal Navy, originally built for the navy of the Commonwealth of England by Phineas Pett II at Deptford, and launched in 1653. By 1677 her armament had been increased to 46 guns.

In 1686 Hampshire was rebuilt at Deptford Dockyard as a 46-gun fourth-rate ship of the line. She was sunk in action on 26 August 1697 in the waters of Hudson Bay off York Factory. Manitoba. during the Battle of Hudson's Bay.

Notes

References

 

Ships of the line of the Royal Navy
1650s ships